Cosmisoma violaceum is a species of beetle in the family Cerambycidae. It was described by Zajciw in 1962.

References

Cosmisoma
Beetles described in 1962
Taxa named by Dmytro Zajciw